Kosuke Matsui (born 28 March 1994) is a Japanese swimmer. He competed in the men's 50 metre freestyle event at the 2018 FINA World Swimming Championships (25 m), in Hangzhou, China.

References

External links
 

1994 births
Living people
Japanese male freestyle swimmers
Medalists at the FINA World Swimming Championships (25 m)
Universiade medalists in swimming
Universiade silver medalists for Japan
Medalists at the 2019 Summer Universiade
Place of birth missing (living people)
21st-century Japanese people